William Francis Kinloch (March 21, 1874 - February 15 1931),  was a Major League Baseball player. He played one game at third base for the 1895 St. Louis Browns. He was born on March 21, 1874, in Providence, Rhode Island, and he died on February 15, 1931, in New York City.  He is buried at the Calvary Cemetery in Woodside, New York.  He played his first game at the age of 21 years.

References

 Baseball Almanac page

1874 births
1931 deaths
Major League Baseball third basemen
St. Louis Browns (NL) players
Baseball players from Providence, Rhode Island
19th-century baseball players
St. Joseph Saints players
Atchison Huskers players
Omaha Omahogs players
Bloomington Blues players
Shreveport Giants players
Davenport River Rats players
Joliet Standards players
Springfield Foot Trackers players
Jackson Senators players
Columbus Discoverers players
Burials at Calvary Cemetery (Queens)